Tulse Hill railway station is in the Tulse Hill area of the London Borough of Lambeth in south London, between railway bridges over the A205, South Circular Road and the A215, Norwood Road. At the moment, there are 4 platforms, each long enough for 8 coaches.

It is served by both Southern and Thameslink, and it is in Travelcard Zone 3.

The closest London Underground station to Tulse Hill is Brixton tube station.

History

Tulse Hill station was opened in 1868 by the London, Brighton and South Coast Railway on their line from London Bridge. In 1869, this was joined by the London, Chatham and Dover Railway's "Metropolitan Extension" line to Holborn Viaduct. The LB&SCR's through line to Streatham and Wimbledon opened in 1871.

The station originally had a bowstring-arched iron and glass roof covering all four platforms. and the brick retaining walls of this structure survive. However, it appears that the roof was demolished as a precautionary measure following the collapse of a similar one at Charing Cross in 1905, and individual platform canopies were then introduced. These had no proper foundations, and gradually subsided until the last of the Edwardian canopies were replaced in the 1990s by British Rail. Some modernisation of the station, including a new covered entrance on the east side, took place under the operator Southern, and ticket gates (funded by the Transport Department) were installed in 2009.

The station can accommodate eight-car trains; the complex sections of track at each end of the station and a large bridge which cannot be moved mean it cannot be extended to accommodate longer ones.

Services
Services at Tulse Hill are operated by Southern and Thameslink using  and  EMUs.

The typical off-peak service in trains per hour is:
 4 tph to  via 
 4 tph to  via 
 2 tph to  via 
 2 tph to  via 

From May 2022 there will be 2 additional services to London Bridge, departing at 07:56 and 08:26

Connections
London Buses routes 2, 68, 196, 201, 322, 432, 468, P13, school route 690 and night routes N2 and N68 serve the station.

References

External links

Railway stations in the London Borough of Lambeth
Former London, Brighton and South Coast Railway stations
Railway stations in Great Britain opened in 1868
Railway stations served by Govia Thameslink Railway